The second season of Legendary aired in 2021. Scoring format was introduced this season, where each judge on the panel and the guest judge scored the houses' out of 10, similar to the ball culture. This season was the only not to feature a live audience as a result of COVID-19 restrictions.

Contestants

House progress 

Table Key
  The house won Legendary
  The house was the runner-up
  The house won the ball and was declared the superior house of the episode
  The house won one of the categories or received positive critiques from the judges and was declared safe
 The house received critiques from the judges and was declared safe
  The house received negative critiques on their performance but was declared safe
  The house was in the bottom two
  The house was eliminated

House scores 
Scores Order: Law + Jameela + Megan + Leiomy + Guest Judge (+ Challenge Win)= Total Score

  The house received the highest score in the episode.
  The house received the lowest score and was in the bottom two.

Vogue redemption battles

Episodes

References

Notes 

2021 American television seasons
2021 in LGBT history
Legendary (TV series)